Derevyagino is a rural locality (a village) in Staroselskoye Rural Settlement, Vologodsky District, Vologda Oblast, Russia. The population was 2 as of 2002.

Geography 
Derevyagino is located 45 km southwest of Vologda (the district's administrative centre) by road. Dor (dorf- village in german lang.)  is the nearest rural locality. Creek Runas- in latvia`s language sounding

References 

Rural localities in Vologodsky District